The fifth season of Australian reality television series The Block, titled The Block 2012, aired on the Nine Network. Both Scott Cam returned as host and Shelley Craft as "Challenge Master". John McGrath & Neale Whitaker returned as judges and introduced new judge Shaynna Blaze and guest judge Darren Palmer. The season premiered on Monday, 16 April 2012 at 7:00 pm.

Like the previous season, this season was filmed in Melbourne, with the four houses to be renovated located in the inner-city suburb of South Melbourne at 401 Dorcas Street.

At first, this season wasn't to air in New Zealand, but has now been picked up by TV3 (the channel that broadcasts the New Zealand adaption of the program). All four previous seasons have aired on Prime

This season was broadcast in the Netherlands in 2018 for the first time.

Contestants

Elimination rounds

Green: This couple won an elimination challenge and became a couple on The Block 2012.

Red: This couple failed to win an elimination challenge and did not become a Block couple.

Season Contestants

Scores

Summary

Judges' Scores

A * indicates that the team used one or more bonus points won previously to inflate their total score.

Results

Elimination week

 Elimination challenges (episodes 1-4)

 The Key Challenge (episode 5)

Room Reveals

Auction

Ratings

Ratings data is from OzTAM and represents the live and same day average viewership from the 5 largest Australian metropolitan centres (Sydney, Melbourne, Brisbane, Perth and Adelaide).

References

2012 Australian television seasons
5